Trust & Custody Services Bank, Ltd. (資産管理サービス信託銀行株式会社, Shisan Kanri Service Shintaku Ginko Kabushiki Gaisha) is a Japanese bank that provides asset administration for banks and insurance companies.  As of August 2017, it had 50 trillion yen in capital.

History
The company was established in January 2001 through an accord of Mizuho Trust & Banking Co,. Ltd., The Dai-Ichi Kangyo Bank, Ltd., The Fuji Bank, Ltd., The Industrial Bank of Japan, Ltd., Asahi Mutual Life Insurance Company, The Dai-ichi Mutual Life Insurance Company, Fukoku Mutual Life Insurance Company, and Yasuda Mutual Life Insurance Company. By 2006 the bank had about $900 billion in assets under management.

References

External links
Trust & Custody Services Bank, Ltd. (in Japanese)

Banks of Japan
Financial services companies based in Tokyo
Trust and Custody Services Bank, Mizuho
Trust banks of Japan
Meiji Yasuda Life
Dai-ichi Life